Sullivan is a surname of Irish origin. An approximate 78 percent of Sullivans are located in the United States as its most 108th common surname according to the 2010 US census.

History 
The name is an anglizised form of O'Sullivan. Due to immigration out of Ireland, is most common in North America, and also found in Australia, as well as Britain.

People with surname

A 

 Alexander Martin Sullivan, Irish politician
 Andi Sullivan, American soccer player
 Andrew Sullivan, conservative author and political commentator
 Ann Sullivan (animator) (1929–2020), American animator
 Anne Sullivan, teacher and mentor to Helen Keller
 Anton Sullivan (born 1991/1992), Offaly Gaelic footballer
 Arthur Sullivan, the composer, best known for his work as part of Gilbert and Sullivan

B 

 Barry Sullivan (American actor) (1912–1994), American actor
 Barry F. Sullivan (1930–2016), American financier
 Becky Sullivan, sound editor
 Billy Sullivan (1891–1946), American character actor
 Brian Sullivan, various people
 Brittany McKey Sullivan, winner of America's Next Top Model, Cycle 11

C 

Chandon Sullivan (born 1996), American football player
Charles L. Sullivan, American politician
Charles P. Sullivan, American lawyer and politician
Charles Sullivan, American character actor
Charles Thompson Sullivan (1884–1948), Canadian mathematician 
Christopher D. Sullivan, US Representative from New York from 1917 to 1941
Chub Sullivan, Major League Baseball first baseman
Con Sullivan, New Zealand-Australian rugby league footballer
Cory Sullivan, Major League Baseball outfielder

D 
Dan Sullivan (United States Senator, R-AK) (born 1964), United States Senator from Alaska
Dan Sullivan (Mayor of Anchorage) (born 1951), mayor of Anchorage, Alaska
Daniel "Horse-Whisperer" Sullivan, horse tamer
Danny Sullivan, race car driver and former winner of the Indianapolis 500
Danny Sullivan (technologist) (born 1965), expert in search engine optimization
Dennis Sullivan, American mathematician
Dennis Michael Sullivan, American engineer
Denny Sullivan, American baseball player
Denny Sullivan (third baseman), American baseball player

E 

Eamon Sullivan, Australian Olympic swimmer
Ed Sullivan, American entertainment writer who hosted a CBS-TV variety show, The Ed Sullivan Show. 
Edmund Joseph Sullivan (1869–1933), British book illustrator
Elijah Sullivan (born 1997), American football player
Eleanore Sullivan
Sir Edward Sullivan, 1st Baronet
Erik Per Sullivan, American actor, most known as Dewey on Malcolm in the Middle

F 

Fleury Sullivan (1862–1897), American baseball player
Fleury F. Sullivan (1870–1951), American politician
Francis L. Sullivan(1903-1956), Tony Award-winning Anglo-American actor
Frances T. Sullivan, New York state assemblywoman 1991–2002
Francis Stoughton Sullivan (1715–1766), Irish lawyer and Irish culture enthusiast.

G 

Gordon R. Sullivan (born 1937) American general
Grant Sullivan (1924–2011), American actor

H 

Harry Sullivan (baseball) (1818–1919), Major League Baseball pitcher
Harry Stack Sullivan, American psychologist and psychoanalyst

J 

J. W. N. Sullivan, journalist and writer of popular science
Jimmy "The Rev" Sullivan (1981–2009), American musician, composer and songwriter of California metal band Avenged Sevenfold 
James Sullivan, various people
Jeremiah C. Sullivan, American Civil War general in the Union Army
Jim Sullivan, various people
John Sullivan, British writer
John Sullivan, general in the American Revolution and Governor of New Hampshire
John Sullivan (British governor) (1788–1855)
John L. Sullivan, American prize-fighter
Jonathan Sullivan, China specialist and political scientist.
Joseph Sullivan, various people
Justin Sullivan, frontman and lyricist of the British rock band New Model Army

K 

Kevin Sullivan (wrestler), American pro wrestler
Kevin J. Sullivan (mayor), mayor of Lawrence, Massachusetts
Kate Sullivan, Chicago news anchor
Kathryn D. Sullivan, first American woman astronaut to walk in space
Kyle Sullivan, American actor

L 

Liam Kyle Sullivan, American comedian/actor
Lily Sullivan, Australian actress
Louis Sullivan (1856–1924), American architect

M 

Margaret Frances Sullivan (1848–1903), Irish-American writer, journalist, editor
Mark T. Sullivan, American author
Maud Durlin Sullivan (1870–1943), American librarian
Maxine Sullivan (1911–1987), American jazz singer
Michael Sullivan (disambiguation)
Mick Sullivan, English rugby league footballer
Mike Sullivan (Canadian politician), Canadian Member of Parliament
Mike Sullivan (governor)
 Morris Sullivan, businessman and co-founder of Sullivan Bluth Studios, an animation studio

N 

Nancy Sullivan (disambiguation), multiple people
Nicole Sullivan, American actress, voice actress, comedian
Niki Sullivan (1937–2004), American rock and roll guitarist

P 

Pat Sullivan, winner of the 1971 Heisman Trophy
Patrick Sullivan (American football executive)
Patrick J. Sullivan (Pennsylvania politician), Pennsylvania congressman
Patrick Joseph Sullivan, Wyoming senator

R 

Robert Baldwin Sullivan, Canadian lawyer, judge, and politician who became the second mayor of Toronto
Roy Sullivan, American park ranger

S 

Sam Sullivan, mayor of Vancouver, British Columbia
Stephen Sullivan (disambiguation), multiple people
Stephanie S. Sullivan, United States Ambassador to the Republic of the Congo
Steve Sullivan, North American NHL hockey player
Susan Sullivan, various people

T 

Teresa Sullivan, president of University of Virginia
Tim or Timothy Sullivan, various people

U 

 Una O'Brien, British civil servant

V 

 Vincent O'Brien (disambiguation), various
 Virginia O'Brien

W 

 William H. Sullivan, US Pambassador

See also 

 O'Sullivan , Ancestral Irish family
 O'Sullivan (surname)

References

Anglicised Irish-language surnames
Surnames of British Isles origin